Punk Goes Acoustic 2 is the sixth compilation in the Punk Goes... series and the second installment in the Punk Goes Acoustic series created by Fearless Records. Like the first album it features previously unreleased and acoustic versions of songs from various pop punk bands.

Track listing

References

Covers albums
Punk Goes series
2007 compilation albums